Helicoverpa pallida is a species of moth of the family Noctuidae. It is endemic to Hawaii.

Subspecies
Helicoverpa pallida nihoaensis (Nihoa Island)
Helicoverpa pallida pallida

External links
A Description of a New Subspecies of Helicoverpa pallida Hardwick With Notes on the Heliothidinae (Lepidoptera: Noctuidae)

P
Endemic moths of Hawaii